The 1947 Jerusalem Riots occurred following the vote in the UN General Assembly in favour of the 1947 UN Partition Plan on 29 November 1947.

The Arab Higher Committee declared a three-day strike and public protest to begin on 2 December 1947, in protest at the vote.  Arabs marching to Zion Square on December 2 were stopped by the British, and the Arabs instead turned towards the commercial center of the City at Mamilla and Jaffa Road, burning many buildings and shops. Violence continued for two more days, with a number of Jewish neighborhoods being attacked.

The New York Times, December 3, 1947, has a three column headline on the front page: "JERUSALEM TORN BY RIOTING; ARABS USE KNIVES, SET FIRES; JEWS REPLY, HAGANAH IN OPEN" with subheads that include: "14 Are Slain In Day" "8 Jews Reported Killed in Palestine Clashes--Mob Loots Shops" etc.

A consequence of the violence was the decision by the Haganah Jewish paramilitary organization to use force to "stop future attacks on Jews". The Irgun had conducted armed attacks aimed against population of nearby Arab villages and a bombing campaign against Arab civilians. On December 12, Irgun militants placed a bomb at the Damascus Gate that killed 20 people.

See also
1947 Aleppo pogrom
1947 Manama pogrom
1947–1948 Civil War in Mandatory Palestine

References

External links
December 2, 1947 – Arabs Attack Jewish Commercial Center

1948 Arab–Israeli War
1947 riots
Ethnic riots
Riots and civil disorder in Mandatory Palestine
1947 in Mandatory Palestine
December 1947 events in Asia
1947 in Judaism
1940s in Jerusalem